This is a list of mammals found in East Timor.

The following tags are used to highlight each species' conservation status as assessed by the International Union for Conservation of Nature:

Order: Chiroptera
 Family: Hipposideridae
 Genus: Hipposideros
 Timor roundleaf bat, H. crumeniferus 
 Family: Pteropodidae
 Genus: Acerodon
 Sunda flying fox, Acerodon mackloti 
 Genus: Cynopterus
Lesser short-nosed fruit bat, C. brachyotis 
 Nusatenggara short-nosed fruit bat, Cynopterus nusatenggara 
 Indonesian short-nosed fruit bat, Cynopterus titthaecheilus 
 Genus: Dobsonia
 Moluccan naked-backed fruit bat, Dobsonia moluccensis 
 Western naked-backed fruit bat, Dobsonia peronii 
 Genus: Eonycteris
 Cave nectar bat, Eonycteris spelaea 
 Genus: Macroglossus
 Long-tongued nectar bat, Macroglossus minimus 
 Genus: Nyctimene
 Pallas's tube-nosed bat, Nyctimene cephalotes  possibly extirpated
 Keast's tube-nosed fruit bat, Nyctimene keasti 
 Genus: Pteropus
 Gray flying fox, Pteropus griseus 
 Lombok flying fox, Pteropus lombocensis 
 Large flying fox, Pteropus vampyrus 
 Genus: Rousettus
 Geoffroy's rousette, Rousettus amplexicaudatus 
 Family: Rhinolophidae
 Genus: Rhinolophus
 Broad-eared horseshoe bat, Rhinolophus euryotis 
 Insular horseshoe bat, Rhinolophus keyensis 
 Woolly horseshoe bat, Rhinolophus luctus 
 Large-eared horseshoe bat, Rhinolophus philippinensis

Order: Diprotodontia
 Family: Phalangeridae
 Genus: Phalanger
 Northern common cuscus, Phalanger orientalis

Order: Primates
 Family: Cercopithecidae
 Genus: Macaca
 Crab-eating macaque, Macaca fascicularis

Order: Rodentia
 Family: Muridae
 Genus: Rattus
 Timor rat, R. timorensis

Order: Sirenia
 Family: Dugongidae
 Genus: Dugong
 Dugong, Dugong dugon

Order Soricomorpha
 Family: Soricidae
 Genus: Crocidura
 Javanese shrew, Crocidura maxi 
 Sunda shrew, Crocidura monticola 
 Timor shrew, Crocidura tenuis 
 Genus: Suncus
 Asian house shrew, Suncus murinus

Order Artiodactyla
 Family: Cervidae
 Genus: Rusa
 Javan rusa, Rusa timorensis

See also
List of chordate orders
Lists of mammals by region

Notes

References
Wilson, D.E. & Reeder, D.M. 2006. Mammal Species of the World: a Taxonomic and Geographic Reference. Baltimore: The Johns Hopkins University Press.
 

 
Mammals
East Timor
 East Timor
East Timor